Jalan Layang Layang (Johor state route J6) is a major road in Johor, Malaysia.

List of junctions

Roads in Johor